Captain Henry Mitchell Jr. (1862–1894) was managing director of a brewery company co-founded by his father Henry Mitchell. He was also superintendent of the fire brigade at the company's Cape Hill brewery, and a captain in the Smethwick Rifle Volunteers.

He founded a brewery football team, Mitchells St George's, later Birmingham St George's F.C.

Harry was born on 11 September 1862, in Smethwick (then part of Staffordshire), and died from typhoid at the age of just 32.

Memorials 
In 1897 Henry Mitchell purchased  of land, and in 1899 presented this to Smethwick Corporation to form what was named in his son's memory "Harry's Park" (now known as "Harry Mitchell Park").

Henry also built and donated Smethwick Drill Hall and the accompanying Sergeant Instructor's house. A plaque from the drill hall, now in the Harry Mitchell Leisure Centre which replaced it, reads:

References 

1862 births
1894 deaths
Mitchells & Butlers
People from Smethwick
Deaths from typhoid fever
British chief executives
Volunteer Force officers
British firefighters
South Staffordshire Regiment officers
19th-century British businesspeople
Military personnel from Staffordshire